Drawing of Sound is the second studio album by American musical duo Windy & Carl. It was released in March 1996 by the duo's own record label Blue Flea (on LP), and the following month by the label Icon (on CD).

Track listing

Personnel
Credits are adapted from the album's liner notes.

 Windy & Carl (Windy Weber and Carl Hultgren) – music, mixing, recording
 Matt Gasper – artwork
 Jay Kuehn – mixing, recording

References

External links
 

1996 albums
Windy & Carl albums
Albums recorded in a home studio